Sarah T. Roberts (born September 2, 1975) is a professor, author, and scholar who specializes in content moderation of social media. She is an expert in the areas of internet culture, social media, digital labor, and the intersections of media and technology. She coined the term "commercial content moderation" (CCM) to describe the job paid content moderators do to regulate legal guidelines and standards. Roberts wrote the book Behind the Screen: Content Moderation in the Shadows of Social Media.

Early life and education 
Roberts grew up in Madison, Wisconsin and attended Madison West High School.

In 1997, Roberts received a B.A. from the University of Wisconsin-Madison, where she double-majored in French and Spanish language and literature. She also earned a certificate of Women's Studies. In 2007, Roberts received an M.A. in Library and Information Science from the University of Wisconsin-Madison's iSchool. In 2014, Roberts earned a PhD in Library and Information Science from the University of Illinois at Urbana–Champaign. Her dissertation, directed by Linda C. Smith, was titled Behind the Screen: The Hidden Digital Labor of Commercial Content Moderation.

Career 
From 2013 to 2016, Roberts was an assistant professor at the University of Western Ontario's Faculty of Information & Media Studies.

In 2016, Roberts became an assistant professor at University of California, Los Angeles's Graduate School of Education and Information Studies. She was awarded tenure and promoted to Associate Professor in 2020.

Roberts' research focuses on commercial content moderation (CCM), the information work and workers, and on the social, economic, and political impact of the widespread adoption of the internet in everyday life. Her work has raised public awareness around issues of social media platform moderation. Roberts' research has been featured in various media outlets including Wired, The New Yorker, The Guardian, The New York Times, among others.

As part of her work, Roberts consulted on the 2018 documentary The Cleaners, which focused on content moderators and the challenges they face.

In 2019, Roberts' book Behind the Screen: Content Moderation in the Shadows of Social Media was published by Yale University Press. It is the first book-length ethnographic study of the work commercial content moderators. The book received positive reviews by publications including the Los Angeles Review of Books.

Along with longtime collaborator Safiya Noble, Roberts is co-director of the Center for Critical Internet Inquiry (C2i2) at UCLA. In 2019, Roberts was awarded an NSF grant to further her research on CCM.

Awards 
 2009: Google, Google Policy Fellowship at American Library Association in Washington, D.C.
 2018: Electronic Frontier Foundation, EFF Pioneer Award: Groundbreaking Content Moderation Researcher 
 2018: Carnegie Fellow

Select works and publications

Selected works

Selected publications

References

External links

 
 Sarah Roberts at the UCLA Graduate School of Education and Information Studies
 

American women academics
Living people
1975 births
Writers from Madison, Wisconsin
University of Wisconsin–Madison College of Letters and Science alumni
University of Illinois alumni
Academic staff of the University of Western Ontario
UCLA Graduate School of Education and Information Studies faculty
Madison West High School alumni
21st-century American women